Bushehr's codes are 48 and 58. In public cars, Taxis and Governal cars the letter is always the same. But in simple cars this letter (ب) depends on the city.

48 
48 is Bushehr county's code and all of the letters are for Bushehr.

58 

Road transport in Iran
Transportation in Bushehr Province